Persoonia nutans, commonly known as the nodding geebung, is a plant in the family Proteaceae and is endemic to part of the Sydney region in New South Wales. It is an erect to spreading shrub with linear leaves and yellow flowers on down-turned pedicels.

Description
Flowering mainly occurs from November to April and the fruit is a green drupe with purple markings.

Taxonomy
Persoonia nutans was first formally described in 1810 by Robert Brown in Transactions of the Linnean Society of London. Brown collected his specimens from near Port Jackson and near Richmond and the Nepean River. In 1991 Peter Weston and Lawrie Johnson designated the Richmond specimens as the lectotype.

Distribution and habitat
Nodding geebung grows in woodland and forest on the Cumberland Plain between Sydney and the Blue Mountains and between Richmond in the north and Macquarie Fields in the south.

Conservation status
Persoonia nutans is listed as "endangered" under the Australian Government Environment Protection and Biodiversity Conservation Act 1999 and the New South Wales Government Threatened Species Conservation Act 1995 and a recovery plan has been prepared. The main threats to the species are loss of habitat due to land clearing, inappropriate fire regimes, habitat degradation and rubbish dumping.

References

Flora of New South Wales
nutans
Plants described in 1810
Taxa named by Robert Brown (botanist, born 1773)